Levi Eshkol served as the third Prime Minister of Israel from June 1963 and until his death in February 1969. During this time he made 13 official, state and working visits to a total of 11 foreign countries. Eshkol was the first head of government in Israel to be invited formally to the White House. In 1966 he was also the first Israeli prime minister to conduct state visits to Africa.

Foreign visits made by Levi Eshkol

National and political leaders hosted in Israel by Levi Eshkol

Notes

References

Israeli prime ministerial visits
Lists of diplomatic trips
Levi Eshkol